Hayden Smelter is a copper smelter at Hayden, Arizona, owned and operated by ASARCO. It processes copper from the Ray mine.

In 2011, the Environmental Protection Agency took action against the smelter for releasing "illegal amounts of lead, arsenic and eight other dangerous compounds."

References

External links

Drawing of Hayden Smelter smokestack

Buildings and structures in Gila County, Arizona
Industrial buildings and structures in Arizona
Asarco
Environment of Arizona
Chimneys in the United States
Smelting